Esterel is a synchronous programming language  for the development of complex reactive systems. The imperative programming style of Esterel allows the simple expression of parallelism and preemption. As a consequence, it is well suited for control-dominated model designs.

The development of the language started in the early 1980s, and was mainly carried out by a team of Ecole des Mines de Paris and INRIA led by Gérard Berry in France. Current compilers take Esterel programs and generate C code or hardware (RTL) implementations (VHDL or Verilog).

The language is still under development, with several compilers out. The commercial version of Esterel is the development environment Esterel Studio. The company that commercialize it (Synfora) initiated a normalization process with the IEEE in April 2007 however the working group (P1778) dissolved March 2011. The Esterel v7 Reference Manual Version v7 30 – initial IEEE standardization proposal is publicly available.

The Multiform Notion of Time
The notion of time used in Esterel differs from that of non-synchronous languages in the following way: The notion of physical time is replaced with the notion of order. Only the simultaneity and precedence of events are considered. This means that the physical time does not play any special role. This is called multiform notion of time. An Esterel program describes a totally ordered sequence of logical instants. At each instant, an arbitrary number of events occur (including 0). Event occurrences that happen at the same logical instant are considered simultaneous. Other events are ordered as their instances of occurrences. There are two types of statements: Those that take zero time (execute and terminate in the same instant) and those that delay for a prescribed number of cycles.

Signals
Signals are the only means of communication. There are valued and non-valued signals. They are further categorized as being input, output, or local signals. A signal has the property of being either present or absent in an instant. Valued signals also contain a value. Signals are broadcast across the program, and that means any process can read or write a signal. The value of a valued signal can be determined in any instant, even if the signal is absent. The default status of a signal is absent. Signals remain absent until they are explicitly set to present using the emit statement.
Communication is instantaneous, that means that a signal emitted in a cycle is visible immediately. Note that one can communicate back and forth in the same cycle.

Signal Coherence rules
 Each signal is only present or absent in a cycle, never both.
 All writers run before any readers do.
Thus
 present A else
     emit A
 end
is an erroneous program: the writer "emit A" must run before the reader "present A", but this program asks the "present A" to be performed first.

The language constructs

Primitive Esterel statements

Pure Esterel has eleven primitive statements.

Derived Esterel statements

Esterel has several derived constructions:

Other Esterel statements

The full Esterel language also has statements for declaring and instantiating modules, for variables, for calling external procedures, and for valued signals.

Example (ABRO)
The following program emits the output O as soon as both inputs A and B have been received. Reset the behaviour whenever the input R is received.

 module ABRO:
 input A, B, R;
 output O;
 
 loop
   [ await A || await B ];
   emit O
 each R
 
 end module

Advantages of Esterel
 Model of time gives programmer precise control
 Concurrency convenient for specifying control systems
 Completely deterministic
 Finite-state language
 Execution time predictable
 Much easier to verify formally
 Can be implemented in hardware as well as in software

Disadvantages of Esterel
 Finite-state nature of the language limits flexibility (but expressivity is sufficient for the chosen application field)
 Semantic challenges
 Avoiding causality violations is often difficult
 Difficult to compile in the general case, but simple correctness criteria exist

See also
Lustre, a cousin programming language
SIGNAL, a dataflow-oriented synchronous language enabling multi-clock specifications
Esterel Technologies, developer of Esterel Studio and other tools
Parallel programming model

References

External links
The Esterel Language at Inria
The Columbia Esterel Compiler an open-source compiler

Synchronous programming languages
Hardware description languages